= Goaler =

Goaler may refer to:

- A colloquial term for a Goaltender
- An archaic spelling for the Gaoler of a Prison
